Janusz "Kuba" Morgenstern (16 November 1922 – 6 September 2011) was a Polish film director and producer.

Janusz Morgenstern was born in 1922 to a Jewish family in the town of Mikulińce, Poland (now Mykulyntsi, Ukraine), to Dawid Morgenstern and Estera (née Druks). 

He debuted as a director with the film Goodbye, See You Tomorrow (1960). His other films include Jowita (1967), We Have to Kill this Love (1972), W-Hour (1979), Lesser of Two Evils (2009). TV series directed by Morgenstern included: Stake Larger than Life (1967–1968), Columbuses (1970) and Polish Roads (1976).   He died in Warsaw, Poland.

Selected filmography
Potem nastąpi cisza (1965)

References

1922 births
2011 deaths
Jews from Galicia (Eastern Europe)
Polish film directors
Polish film producers
Łódź Film School alumni
People from Ternopil Oblast